eToro is a social trading and multi-asset investment company that focuses on providing financial and copy trading services. Its headquarters are located in Central Israel, and the company has registered offices in Cyprus, the United Kingdom, the United States, and Australia.

History 
eToro was founded as RetailFX in 2007 in Tel Aviv, by brothers Yoni Assia and Ronen Assia together with David Ring.

In 2010, the firm released the eToro OpenBook social investment platform, along with its CopyTrader feature, that enables investors to copy the network's top traders automatically. eToro’s Social newsfeed and a Popular Investor program were later developed on top of this feature. Later that year, the firm released an Android app.

Between 2007 and 2013, the company raised $31.5 million in four rounds of funding. In December 2014, it raised $27 million from Russian and Chinese investors. In December 2017, it joined CoinDash to develop Blockchain-based social trading. In 2018, it raised a further $100 million in a private funding round. Overall, more than $162 million has been invested in the company by investment firms.

In 2013, the firm introduced the capability to invest in stocks and CFDs, alongside commodities and currencies, with an initial offering of 110 stock products (which later grew to 3000 financial products). The same year, it was authorized to offer services in the UK, under the subsidiary eToro UK. In January 2014, the firm added cryptocurrencies to its investment instruments.

In April 2014, the firm added 130 British and German stocks composing the FTSE 100 Index and the DAX30 indices to the company's stock selection. In 2017, it launched a CopyPortfolio feature, enabling investors to copy investment portfolios from the best-performing traders.

In 2018, eToro launched a cryptocurrency wallet for Android and iOS. In May 2018, it entered the US market by offering 10 cryptocurrencies. 

In March 2019, eToro acquired Danish blockchain company Firmo for an undisclosed sum. In October 2019, eToro released a sentiment-based crypto portfolio using AI technology to evaluate Twitter's current positive or negative impressions of digital assets. In November 2019, the firm acquired Delta, a crypto portfolio tracker application company, based in Belgium. In March 2019, the company launched its cryptocurrency trading platform and its standalone cryptocurrency wallet to US users.

In 2021, the company reported operating in 140 countries and having 20 million users. In March 2021, it announced that it is planning to become a publicly traded company through a reverse subsidiary merger with FinTech Acquisition Corp V (NASDAQ:FTCV), a Special Purpose Acquisition Company (SPAC) backed by former Bancorp CEO Betsy Z. Cohen. The combined company will operate as eToro Group Ltd and have an implied estimated enterprise value of $10.4 billion at closing with $650 million in funding coming from private investment in public equity (PIPE) from Softbank Vision Fund 2, Third Point, Fidelity Management, Wellington Management, ION Investment Group and Research Co.

In 2020, the company acquired Marq Millions, the UK division of e-money, which was then renamed to eToro Money. The company also obtained a primary membership of Visa and an electronic money institution (EMI) license from the Financial Conduct Authority. In December 2021, the company launched the eToro Money debit card for UK residents that includes issuing a VISA debit card to users.

In December 2021, eToro amended its agreement with FinTech Acquisition Corp. V to extend the merger agreement's termination date to June 30, 2022. Its SPAC valuation has been reduced from $10.4 billion to $8.8 billion due to market shifts and SPAC issues.

In February 2022, eToro released its first Super Bowl ad during Super Bowl LVI, also nicknamed as "Crypto Bowl”. Called “Flying your way”, the 30-seconds commercial featured a consumer seeking cryptocurrency advice and crypto enthusiasts falling from the sky to offer him guidance and assistance, asking “to the moon?” The advertisement also featured a Shiba Inu dog addressing meme coin Shiba Inu (SHIB) and Bored Ape.

In August 2022, eToro signed a definitive agreement to acquire Gatsby, a fintech startup specializing in options and stock trading, for $50 million in cash and common equity.

In September 2022, the Reserve Bank of India (RBI), India's central bank, released a list of 34 forex trading online platforms, in which eToro was also listed as illegal platform in India.

Operations
eToro's main research and development office is located in Tel Aviv, Israel. In addition to legal entities registered in the UK, US, Australia and Cyprus. The firm is regulated by the CySEC authority in the EU; it is authorized by the FCA in the UK, and by FinCEN in the United States, and by the ASIC in Australia. In 2013, it was fined €50.000 by CySEC due to detected weaknesses which concerned its organisation and operation structure back to 2010. In 2015, eToro was added to Quebec blacklist as an unauthorized foreign company that encouraged residents to invest in binary options via its trading platform.

The company operates in 140 countries. As of March 2022, eToro had 27 million users and 2.4 million financed accounts.

Marketing and expansion 
In August 2018, eToro announced a sponsorship deal with seven UK Premier League teams including Tottenham Hotspur, Brighton & Hove Albion F.C., Cardiff City F.C., Crystal Palace F.C., Leicester City F.C., Newcastle United F.C., and Southampton F.C. The partnership continued for the 2019-20 Premier League with Aston Villa F.C. and Everton F.C. joining Southampton F.C., Tottenham Hotspur F.C., Crystal Palace F.C., and Leicester City F.C.

In 2019, the company had sponsorship agreements with the American KTM team of MotoGP, the Ultimate Fighting Championship, French tennis player Gael Monfils and German football club Eintracht Frankfurt. In 2020, it launched twelve sponsorship deals with the UK, German, French and Danish sport clubs, including West Bromwich Albion, Burnley FC, FC Augsburg, 1. FC Cologne, Hamburger SV (Bundesliga 2), Union Berlin, VfL Wolfsburg, AS Monaco and FC Midtjylland. In October 2020, Rugby Australia announced that eToro would be a Presenting Partner for the 2020 Tri Nations rugby series, expanding it in 2021 to be the major partner for three years.

Controversies

2022 closure of stock positions in Magnit PJSC

On March 2, 2022, eToro triggered a stop-loss closure of investor positions in Magnit stock (MGNTL.L) at $0.01 per share. eToro representatives claimed that the positions had reached a "default" and "mandatory" stop loss of $0.01 per share. Connections were drawn to a similar incident in July 2021, where positions in Ryanair Holdings plc (RYAAY) were sold without permission for $0.01 a share.

The following day, eToro notified holders of various Russian-based stocks that their positions in MGNTL.L would be closed "due to liquidity problems" and the "impact of the current geopolitical events on markets". Other Russian-based stocks were also reviewed for potential liquidation. The day after saw eToro closing all MGNTL.L positions at around $0.0124 per share.

A public Telegram group called "eToro Action" was formed during this period, in protest of the sudden closures. A petition was also put forth on Change.org, for the rights to maintain open positions of stocks on eToro, which amassed over 1,000 signatures in four days. On March 7 2022, eToro reimburses clients for the total initial invested amounts of MGNTL.L.

2021 closure of leveraged positions 

On January 8, 2021, eToro notified its European clients that "due to extreme market volatility in the crypto markets, margin positions for all leveraged crypto positions" should be changed to nonleveraged, or they would be closed within four hours.

Lawyers and users expressed intent to file a class action lawsuit and a motion to revoke eToro license in Cyprus. The firm said that this affected “two percent of users”. A law professor Jurij Toplak said he would gather users and file motion to revoke eToro license in Cyprus where it is registered.

2021 short squeeze 
Following the GameStop short squeeze, retail investors on Reddit claimed that eToro changed the terms of service to enforce a stop-loss on non-leveraged buy positions that did not have it enabled. While stop-loss is designed to reduce risks on the volatile markets, the enforcement without notice allegedly caused losses for numerous clients that had their positions closed on unfavorable terms.

See also
Electronic trading platform
Financial innovation
List of social networking services

References

Companies based in Tel Aviv
Digital currency exchanges
Financial services companies established in 2007
Financial derivative trading companies
Financial services companies based in London
Financial services companies of Cyprus
Financial services companies of Israel
Foreign exchange companies
Online brokerages
Companies based in Limassol
Trading companies
Electronic trading platforms
Financial services companies of the United Kingdom
Financial services companies of the United States
Israeli companies established in 2007
Alternative investment management companies
Brokerage firms
2007 establishments in Israel